The 1993 French Figure Skating Championships took place in Grenoble for singles and pairs and in La Roche-sur-Yon for ice dance. Skaters competed in the disciplines of men's singles, women's singles, pair skating, and ice dancing on the senior level. The event was used to help determine the French team to the 1993 World Championships and the 1993 European Championships.

Results

Men

Ladies

Pairs

Ice dance

External links
 French article

French Figure Skating Championships, 1993
1993 in French sport
French Figure Skating Championships